Mirpur is an upazila of Kushtia District in the Division of Khulna, Bangladesh.

History 
The former Mirpur Thana, which was formed in 1885, became an upazila on 1 August 1983.

Geography 
It has 48,215 households and a total area of 317.35 km2.

Demographics 
According to 2011 Bangladesh census, Mirpur had a population of 330,115. Males constituted 50.14% of the population and females 49.86. Muslims formed 97.798% of the population, Hindus 2.194%, Christians 0.002% and others 0.006%. Mirpur had a literacy rate of 41.86% for the population 7 years and above.

At the 1991 Bangladesh census, Mirpur had a population of 266,046. Males constitute 51.76% of the population, and females 48.24%. The population aged 18 or over is 136,611. Mirpur has an average literacy rate of 21.3% (7+ years), compared to the national average of 32.4%.

Administration 
Mirpur Upazila is divided into Mirpur Municipality and 13 union parishads: Ambaria, Amla, Bahalbaria, Baruipara, Chhatian, Chithalia, Dhubail, Fulbaria, Kursha, Malihad, Poradaha, Sadarpur, and Talbaria. The union parishads are subdivided into 116 mauzas and 192 villages.

Mirpur Municipality is subdivided into 9 wards and 9 mahallas.

See also 
Upazilas of Bangladesh
Districts of Bangladesh
Divisions of Bangladesh

References 

Upazilas of Kushtia District
Kushtia District
Khulna Division